Frederik Jacobus Johannes "Frits" Sins (born 30 August 1964 in Sittard) is a Dutch slalom canoer who competed from the early 1980s to the mid-1990s. Competing in two Summer Olympics, he earned his best finish of 19th in the K-1 event in Barcelona in 1992.

References

1964 births
Living people
Canoeists at the 1992 Summer Olympics
Canoeists at the 1996 Summer Olympics
Dutch male canoeists
Olympic canoeists of the Netherlands
People from Sittard
Sportspeople from Limburg (Netherlands)
20th-century Dutch people